Roger Ray Bacusmo Pogoy (born June 16, 1992) is a Filipino professional basketball player for the TNT Tropang Giga of the Philippine Basketball Association (PBA). He has also represented the Philippines national team in international competitions.

Early life and college career
Pogoy grew up in Talisay, Cebu and was taught basketball by his father, who was a former basketball player in Mindanao. In high school, he started as a Team B player. He eventually became a star for the University of Cebu Junior Webmasters, leading them to the Cebu Schools Athletic Foundation, Inc. (CESAFI) juniors title in 2008, and claiming the Finals MVP award. He joined the Tamaraws after his father read about the FEU tryouts in Cebu in the local newspaper, and encouraged him to try out.

He first played for the FEU Tamaraws in UAAP Season 74. The Tamaraws made it to the finals that year, but lost to the Ateneo Blue Eagles in two games. In Season 75, Pogoy had a game where he scored 17 points and 13 rebounds. The team finished fifth, with a win–loss record of 9–5. Pogoy returned for Season 76. They lost in the Final Four to the De La Salle Green Archers. In the Season 77 Finals, Pogoy scored 10 of his 14 points in the third quarter to help the Tamaraws win Game 1. They eventually lost in 3 games to the NU Bulldogs.

In Season 78, Pogoy led all scorers in the game that brought them back to the Finals, scoring 16 points with 10 coming in the second half. Their opponent in the Finals were the UST Growling Tigers. In Game 1, Pogoy had 15 points (12 in the first quarter) to lead a balanced attack to get the win. In Game 2, Pogoy had 12 points but missed the latter part of the fourth quarter due to cramps. The Tamaraws lost that game, 62–56. In Game 3, Pogoy scored 14 points to put UST away, winning FEU its first title since 2005. He graduated after that season.

Professional career

PBA D-League 
Pogoy played for Café France in the D-League Aspirant's Cup in 2012. In 2014, he and several of his Tamaraw teammates played for the MJM Builders. In 2015, he played for the Phoenix Petroleum.

PBA

Rookie Season (2016–2017) 
Pogoy was drafted in 2016 from the national team training pool by the TNT Katropa, and signed for P9 million. He debuted with 9 points and 3 rebounds. In the next game, against Barangay Ginebra San Miguel, he scored 15 points, played good defense on L.A. Tenorio, and grabbed a crucial offensive rebound. He had 16 points to go along with 4 assists and 4 steals in a 104–92 win against the Mahindra Floodbusters. In a win that qualified the Katropa for the All-Filipino playoffs, he scored 20 points and had 4 rebounds. In the quarterfinals, the team ousted the Globalport Batang Pier, setting them up for a semifinals series against the San Miguel Beermen. In Game 3, he had a then career-high 22 points with 7 rebounds and 6 triples (3 made in the final quarter) to lead the series 2–1. The KaTropa eventually lost the series in 7 games.

Halfway through the Commissioner's Cup, Pogoy made the All-Star Games as a member of Gilas Pilipinas. The KaTropa finished with a record of 8–3, good for 4th place. They beat Meralco in the first round, and Ginebra in the second round. Prior to the Finals, he averaged 12 points, 3 rebounds, and 2 threes made. For the Finals, they matched up against the Beermen. In Game 1, he set another career high of 27 points with 5 threes, 5 rebounds, and 3 steals. That, and Joshua Smith's lay-up with 1.6 seconds left won the game for the Katropa. In Game 2, he was fined PHP 30,000.00 for deliberately hitting Arwind Santos in the groin. TNT eventually lost 88–102. They lost Game 3, but won Game 4. San Miguel then closed out the series to win the Commissioner's Cup.

After his stint with the national team, Pogoy and Gilas teammates Jayson Castro and Troy Rosario returned to the KaTropa for the Governor's Cup. The team clinched a twice-to-beat advantage and beat Rain or Shine in the quarterfinals. They also faced Ginebra in the semis. TNT lost in four games. He finished the season winning Rookie of the Year and was on the All-Rookie Team.

No Championship (2017–19) 
In his first game of his 2nd season, Pogoy scored 16 points on 7 of 18 shooting. He had a game-high 24 points along with 8 rebounds, 3 assists, and 2 steals against his former FEU teammates Mac Belo and Raymar Jose. The KaTropa made it to the playoffs, but failed to advance to the semis. He was second in voting among Visayas players for the All-Star Games. In the Commissioner's Cup, they lost to the Beermen again. Pogoy was injured with a sprained ankle in the Governor's Cup, but he was able to play in their next games as the KaTropa did not make the playoffs.

In the opening game for the 2019 Philippine Cup, Pogoy grabbed a career-high 16 rebounds in a loss to Ginebra. He had 30 points (17 coming in the fourth quarter and a three to send the game into overtime) and 12 boards in a 84–93 loss to the Phoenix Fuel Masters. In a game against the Magnolia Hotshots, he scored 26 points, scoring 5 of the team's 8 points in overtime, including a turnaround jumper from the post over Jio Jalalon that sealed the win. After sitting out versus Rain or Shine due to flu, Roger Pogoy returned with 28 points on 13-of-17 shooting, including 12 in the final quarter, where he scored 10 straight in a span of less than two minutes and led the TNT KaTropa’s 127–89 whitewashing of the Blackwater Elite while also collecting six rebounds and four assists. The KaTropa won two more games before losing to Northport, giving them a record of 7–4. Before the playoffs, he was part of the All-Star Three-Point Shootout, the Rookie-Sophomores vs. Juniors Game, and the North vs. South Game in the 2019 All-Star Weekend. They lost in the quarterfinals to the Beermen in 3 games. He was also a finalist for Best Player of the Conference.

In the 2019 Commissioner's Cup, Pogoy had a then career-high 31 points on 10 of 21 shooting in a physical 114–88 match against Phoenix. In a win against Ginebra, he made a new career-high with 38 points on 10 threes, becoming only the fourth local player in league history to shoot that many threes in a game. With Terrence Jones as their import, they clinched 1st seed. They beat Alaska in the quarterfinals, and Ginebra in the semifinals. They matched up with the Beermen once again, winning Game 1 of the Finals. San Miguel evened the series in Game 2. In Game 3, Pogoy scored 29 points with 5 threes and 8 rebounds to take a 2–1 lead. The Beermen eventually won the series in six games, 4–2.

In the 2019 Governor's Cup, they started off 7–0 before losing to the NLEX Road Warriors. They clinched the 3rd seed, but Pogoy suffered a back injury, later revealed to be a nerve root irritation caused by a bulging disc. He played through it in the semifinals after missing a SEA Games stint. TNT lost in 5 games to the Meralco Bolts. He ended the season as a member of the Mythical Second Team.

Bubble Season and First Championship (2020–present) 
On September 17, the PBA Board of Governors have approved a plan to restart the season on October 11 (originally on October 9), then was given a provisional approval by the Inter-Agency Task Force for the Management of Emerging Infectious Diseases (IATF-EID) on September 24. All games were played in the "PBA bubble" in Angeles City, the isolation zone specifically created for league operations. In the their first game of the bubble, Pogoy erupted for a career-high 45 points (21 in the first half) with 10 threes (which tied his career-high and the franchise record for most threes made by a local) to get their first win 100–95. In the next game, his teammate Bobby Ray Parks Jr. scored 40 points against the Terrafirma Dyip, making him and Pogoy the first teammates in 30 years to score 40 points one after the other. He injured his left ankle in the 3rd game, but showed no signs of injury in the next game as he scored 30 points, 5 rebounds, 2 assists, and a block. He earned the first PBA Bubble Player of the Week. TNT was able to win 5 straight games before losing their first game against NLEX. They eventually made the playoffs as a 3rd seed. He scored 34 points in a quarterfinals win against the Alaska Aces. In the semis, they were able to eliminate Phoenix in five games, making it to the Finals. In the Finals, Pogoy scored 19 points and 38 in the first two losses to Ginebra. In Game 3, he top-scored for his team with 18 points to get their first win in the Finals. In Game 4, he scored 34 points in a losing effort as Ginebra took a 3–1 lead. In the last game, he scored 23 points as Ginebra won the championship. Pogoy was nominated for Best Player of the Conference, but lost to Stanley Pringle.

In the 2021 Philippine Cup, Pogoy scored 13 points in their first game. They won 6 straight games, but had their first loss against San Miguel. They then won their next four games, closing out as the 1st seed. Pogoy scored 16 points to lead TNT to eliminate Ginebra in the first round. In Game 1 of the semis against the Beermen, he scored 23 points and prevented Marcio Lassiter from taking a shot to win 89–88. Lassiter beat the buzzer in Game 2 to even the series, but TNT eventually won in 7 games, setting themselves up for a showdown against Magnolia. This was actually Pogoy's first playoff series win against the Beermen ever since he came into the league. In Game 5 of the Finals he scored 19 points, 3 rebounds, 3 steals and 2 assists as he finally won his first PBA championship.

Career statistics

As of the end of 2021 Season

PBA Season-by-season averages

|-
| align=left | 
| align=left | TNT
| 58 || 27.9 || .418 || .326 || .559 || 4.1 || 1.2 || .8 || .4 || 11.1 
|-
| align=left | 
| align=left | TNT
| 37 || 26.4 || .423 || .230 || .671 || 5.0 || 1.8 || 1.3 || .4 || 12.7
|-
| align=left | 
| align=left | TNT
| 53 || 36.9 || .444 || .350 || .631 || 5.6 || 1.6 || 1.8 || .3 || 16.6
|-
| align=left | 
| align=left | TNT
| 22 || 36.4 || .412 || .318 || .831 || 5.7 || 2.5 || 2.0 || .2 || 20.0
|-
| align=left | 
| align=left | TNT
| 33 || 30.8 || .380 || .232 || .700 || 3.9 || 1.8 || 1.5 || .5 || 13.5
|-class=sortbottom
| align="center" colspan=2 | Career
| 203 || 31.4 || .419 || .306 || .668 || 4.8 || 1.6 || 1.4 || .4 || 14.2

College

Elimination rounds 

|-
| align="left" | 2011-12
| align="left" rowspan="5" | FEU
| 11 || 4.7 || .556 || .000 || .571 || 1.8 || .4 || .2 || .1 || 2.2
|-
| align="left" | 2012-13
| 14 || 20.7 || .474 || .143 || .765 || 5.5 || 1.5 || .5 || .6 || 6.2
|-
| align="left" | 2013-14
| 14 || 21.2 || .415 || .320 || .778 || 6.0 || 1.4 || .5 || .6 || 6.4
|-
| align="left" | 2014-15
| 14 || 24.1 || .442 || .379 || .432 || 5.9 || 2.0 || .9 || .5 || 8.5
|-
| align="left" | 2015-16
| 14 || 20.1 || .394 || .342 || .636 || 3.7 || 1.5 || .5 || .9 || 10.8
|-class=sortbottom
| align="center" colspan=2 | Career
| 67 || 18.8 || .431 || .324 || .604 || 4.7 || 1.4 || .5 || .6 || 7.0

Playoffs 

|-
| align="left" | 2013-14
| align="left" rowspan="3" | FEU
| 2 || 21.5 || .308 || .333 || - || 7.0 || 1.0 || 1.0 || - || 5.0
|-
| align="left" | 2014-15
| 6 || 24.7 || .302 || .300 || .429 || 6.3 || 1.5 || .7 || 1.2 || 5.8
|-
| align="left" | 2015-16
| 4 || 25.4 || .333 || .323 || .750 || 4.0 || 1.0 || .8 || .8 || 14.3
|-class=sortbottom
| align="center" colspan=2 | Career
| 12 || 24.4 || .319 || .319 || .577 || 5.7 || 1.3 || .8 || .8 || 8.5

National team career 
Pogoy first played for the national team in the SEABA Stankovic Cup in 2016. He was also on the 24-man list for the 2016 Olympic Qualifying Tournament (OQT) in Manila. He also joined the team for the 2016 FIBA Asia Challenge. He averaged 6.8 points, 4.2 rebounds and 1.6 assists in the tournament.

Pogoy was also named to the 2017 SEABA Championship lineup, and the 2017 William Jones Cup lineup. His team also finished 7th in the 2017 FIBA Asia Cup. He also participated in the November 2017 window and February 2018 window for the 2019 FIBA Asia World Cup Qualifiers.

In 2018, Pogoy was on the Gilas 3x3 team for the 2018 FIBA 3x3 World Cup. He scored 4 points in his debut against Brazil. They lost their next games against Mongolia and Canada, but finished their campaign with a win against Russia to finish 3rd in Pool D.

Role in Philippines-Australia brawl 

In a game against Australia in the July window, Pogoy hit Australian player Chris Goulding with two hard fouls, one away from the play. Kickert, Goulding's teammate, retaliated by giving a similar hard foul to Pogoy with his elbow and forearm. Kickert's response caused Blatche and Jayson Castro to rush to retaliate. Other Filipino players from the bench rushed onto the court to join the brawl.

Return and subsequent competitions 
Pogoy made his return after his suspension in a game against Kazakhstan. He was also on the 2019 FIBA World Cup lineup. Pogoy only shot 42% from the field and 25% on threes for the tournament. He was also selected to join the Gilas squad for the 2019 Southeast Asian Games but was unable to play due to a nerve root irritation caused by a bulging disc.

Before the pandemic, he played against Indonesia in the FIBA Asia Cup 2021 Qualifiers.

In 2022, he played in the February qualifiers for the 2023 FIBA World Cup. He also got a silver medal in the 31st SEA Games.

Personal life 
A few weeks after winning his first championship in 2021, Pogoy married his longtime girlfriend Love Portes.

References

External links

1992 births
Living people
2019 FIBA Basketball World Cup players
Basketball players from Cebu
Cebuano people
Competitors at the 2021 Southeast Asian Games
FEU Tamaraws basketball players
Filipino men's 3x3 basketball players
Filipino men's basketball players
People from Talisay, Cebu
Philippine Basketball Association All-Stars
Philippines men's national basketball team players
Philippines national 3x3 basketball team players
Shooting guards
Small forwards
Southeast Asian Games medalists in basketball
Southeast Asian Games silver medalists for the Philippines
TNT Tropang Giga draft picks
TNT Tropang Giga players